Maharaja Agrasen College (informally Agrasen College or simply Agrasen Jagadhri) is a government aided private college of Arts and Commerce, located in Jagadhri, in the state of Haryana, India.

Academic provision
The College is co-educational, catering to a total of 1143 students (965 in grant-in-aid and 178 in self-financing courses) in four faculties of Arts, Commerce, Business Administration and Computer Science. Of these students, 904 are boys and 239 girls in 13 departments (10 in Arts and one each in Commerce, Business Administration and Computer Science). The College has 11 permanent and 27 contractual faculty members.

The Principal P.K.Bajpai remains in news for hiding facts regarding a serious criminal case pending against him at the time of appointment. The VC of the Kurukshetra University has withdrawn approval of his selection. The Higher Education Commission has ordered action against him.

Professional courses at undergraduate level
 BCA

Postgraduate courses
 M. Com.

General courses
 B.Com with Computer Application (Vocational)      
 B.Com Awareness (With Economics)
 B.Com with Principles & Practices of Insurance (Voc.)   
 B.Com with Tax Procedures & Practices (Voc.)
 B.A with English, Hindi, Economics, Political Science, Public Administration, History, Physical Education, Sociology, Commercial Arts, Music (Instrumental), Computer, Hindi-Elective, Sanskrit (Comp.).

Campus
MAC Campus covers a total area of 10.5 acres of land (Campus area of 44531 m2 with built up area of 10000 m2). It is located 180 km from Delhi and 120 km from Chandigarh.

Support services and facilities

 Well equipped gym        
 Audio-Video conference hall
 Digital library 
 Boys' and girls' common room
 Wi-Fi campus
 Communication/language lab
 Spacious playground  
 EDUSAT system

 Bus & rail pass facility 
 Cafeteria 
 Air-conditioned auditorium 
 Fully equipped computer labs for UG/PG faculties   
 Hostel facility for boys and girls
 LCD & laptop facility available for teaching 
 Smart classrooms

References

External links
 College website

Universities and colleges in Haryana
All India Council for Technical Education
Educational institutions established in 1971
Education in Yamunanagar
Kurukshetra University
Memorials to Agrasen